Black Market Baby is a 1977 American film directed by Robert Day. It was the second TV movie made by Brut Productions, the first being Sweet Hostage.

Plot
A childless couple persuade a college student to have their child.

Cast
Linda Purl as Anne Macarino
Desi Arnaz Jr. as Steve Aletti
Jessica Walter as Louise Carmino
David Doyle as Joseph Carmino
Tom Bosley as Dr. Andrew Brantford
Bill Bixby as Herbert Freemont
Lucille Benson as Mrs. Krieg
Annie Potts as Linda Cleary
Tracy Brooks Swope as Babs
Allen Joseph as Albert Macarino
Mark Thomas as Mario Macarino
Argentina Brunetti as Aunt Imelda

Reception
The Los Angeles Times called it "outstanding in all respects".

It was the 36th highest rated show of the week.

References

External links
Black Market Baby at IMDb
Black Market Baby at TCMDB

1977 television films
1977 films